Norma is an Estonian company which produces car safety system components; Norma belongs to Autoliv group. These safety system components are made for e.g. Audi, Bentley, Porsche, Volkswagen and Tesla cars.

The predecessor of the company was Michelson's workshop, which was established in 1891. The name "Norma" is used since 1931.

Nowadays Norma was established in 1994.

In 2002, the net turnover was 1 millard Estonian krones. In 2002, most production (98%) was exported.

References

External links
 

Companies of Estonia
Automotive safety